Ndendé is a town and capital of the Dola Department in Ngounié Province, southern Gabon. It is located 549 kilometres southeast of Libreville at the junction of the N1 and N6 roads. In 2006, the population was 6,346.

Populated places in Ngounié Province